Black Widow (Natalia Alianovna "Natasha" Romanova; Russian: Наталья Альяновна "Наташа" Романова) is a character appearing in American comic books published by Marvel Comics. Created by editor and plotter Stan Lee, scripter Don Rico, and artist Don Heck, the character debuted in Tales of Suspense #52 (April 1964). The character was introduced as a Russian spy, an antagonist of the superhero Iron Man. She later defected to the United States, becoming an agent of the fictional spy agency S.H.I.E.L.D. and a member of the superhero team the Avengers.

The character has appeared in numerous forms of media, such as animated television series, video games, and films.

Scarlett Johansson portrayed Natasha Romanoff in the Marvel Cinematic Universe films Iron Man 2 (2010), The Avengers (2012), Captain America: The Winter Soldier (2014), Avengers: Age of Ultron (2015), Captain America: Civil War (2016), Avengers: Infinity War (2018), Captain Marvel (2019), Avengers: Endgame (2019), and Black Widow (2021), with Lake Bell voicing the character in the animated series What If...? (2021).

Publication history

The Black Widow's first appearances were as a recurring, non-costumed, Russian-spy antagonist in the feature "Iron Man", beginning in Tales of Suspense #52 (April 1964). Five issues later, she recruits the besotted costumed archer and later superhero Hawkeye to her cause. Her government later supplies her with her first Black Widow costume and high-tech weaponry, but she eventually defects to the United States after appearing, temporarily brainwashed against the U.S., in the superhero-team series The Avengers #29 (July 1966). The Widow later becomes a recurring ally of the team before officially becoming its 16th member many years later.

The Black Widow was visually updated in 1970: The Amazing Spider-Man #86 (July 1970) reintroduced her with shoulder-length red hair (instead of her former short black hair), a skintight black costume, and wristbands which fired spider threads.

John Romita, the artist responsible for the redesign elaborated on how the character was updated. "I did the costume on the Black Widow. One of my favorite strips from when I was a kid was Miss Fury. They had done a Miss Fury book at Marvel, and when I found out they had the rights to her, I said I'd love to do a Miss Fury book sometime. I had done an updated drawing of Miss Fury, and Stan said, "Why don't we redesign the Black Widow costume based on Miss Fury?" So I took the mask off her face, and made the Black Widow, the one in the patent leather jumpsuit."

In short order, The Black Widow starred in her own series in Amazing Adventures #1–8 (Aug. 1970–Sept. 1971), sharing that split book with the feature Inhumans. The Black Widow feature was dropped after only eight issues (the Inhumans feature followed soon, ending with issue #10).

Immediately after her initial solo feature ended, the Black Widow co-starred in Daredevil  #81–124 (Nov. 1971–Aug. 1975), of which #92-107 were cover titled Daredevil and the Black Widow. Daredevil writer Gerry Conway recounted, "It was my idea to team up Daredevil and the Black Widow, mainly because I was a fan of Natasha, and thought she and Daredevil would have interesting chemistry." Succeeding writers, however, felt that Daredevil worked better as a solo hero, and gradually wrote the Black Widow out of the series. She was immediately recast into the super-team series The Champions as the leader of the titular superhero group, which ran for 17 issues (Oct. 1975–Jan. 1978).

Throughout the 1980s and 1990s, the Black Widow appeared frequently as both an Avengers member and a freelance agent of S.H.I.E.L.D. She starred in a serialized feature within the omnibus comic-book series Marvel Fanfare #10–13 (Aug. 1983–March 1984), written by George Pérez and Ralph Macchio, with art by penciller Perez. These stories were later collected in the oversized one-shot Black Widow: Web of Intrigue #1 (June 1999).

The Widow guest-starred in issues of Solo Avengers, Force Works, Iron Man, Marvel Team-Up, and other comics. She had made frequent guest appearances in Daredevil since the late 1970s.

She starred in a three-issue arc, "The Fire Next Time", by writer Scott Lobdell and penciller Randy Green, in Journey into Mystery #517–519 (Feb.–April 1998).

A new ongoing Black Widow comic title debuted in April 2010. The first story arc was written by Marjorie Liu with art by Daniel Acuña. Beginning with issue #6 (Sept. 2010), the title was written by Duane Swierczynski, with artwork by Manuel Garcia and Lorenzo Ruggiero.

Black Widow appeared as a regular character throughout the 2010–2013 Secret Avengers series, from issue #1 (July 2010) through its final issue #37 (March 2013).

Black Widow appears in the 2013 Secret Avengers series by Nick Spencer and Luke Ross.

Black Widow appears in a relaunched ongoing series by writer Nathan Edmondson and artist Phil Noto. The first issue debuted in Jan. 2014.

In October 2015, it was announced that Mark Waid and Chris Samnee would be launching a new Black Widow series for 2016 as part of Marvel's post-Secret Wars relaunch. The first issue was released in March 2016.

Limited series and specials
Aside from the arcs in Marvel Fanfare and Journey into Mystery, the Black Widow has starred in four limited series and four graphic novels.

The three-issue Black Widow (June-Aug. 1999), under the Marvel Knights imprint, starred Romanova and fully introduced her appointed successor, Captain Yelena Belova, who had briefly appeared in an issue of the 1999 series Inhumans. The writer for the story arc, "The Itsy-Bitsy Spider" was Devin K. Grayson while J. G. Jones was the artist. The next three-issue, Marvel Knights mini-series, also titled Black Widow (Jan.–March 2001) featured both Black Widows in the story arc "Breakdown", by writers Devin Grayson and Greg Rucka with painted art by Scott Hampton.

Romanova next starred in another solo miniseries titled Black Widow: Homecoming (Nov. 2004–April 2005), also under the Marvel Knights imprint and written by science fiction novelist Richard K. Morgan, with art initially by Bill Sienkiewicz and later by Sienkiewicz over Goran Parlov layouts. A six-issue sequel, Black Widow: The Things They Say About Her (Nov. 2005–April 2006; officially Black Widow 2: The Things They Say About Her in the series' postal indicia), by writer Morgan, penciller Sean Phillips, and inker Sienkiewicz, picks up immediately where the previous miniseries left off, continuing the story using many of the same characters.

She starred in the solo graphic novel Black Widow: The Coldest War (April 1990), and co-starred in three more: Punisher/Black Widow: Spinning Doomsday's Web (Dec. 1992); Daredevil/Black Widow: Abattoir (July 1993); and Fury/Black Widow: Death Duty (June 1995), also co-starring Marvel UK's Night Raven.

Black Widow is also featured in the short story Love Is Blindness in I Heart Marvel: Marvel Ai (2006) #1 (April 2006), where she instigates a humorous fight with Elektra over Daredevil's affections. The comic is stylized to look like Japanese animation and uses images, not words, inside the speech and thought bubbles to convey what the characters are saying/thinking.

In 2010, the year in which the character, called only Natasha Romanoff, made her film debut in Iron Man 2, the Black Widow received two separate miniseries. Black Widow and the Marvel Girls was an all-ages, four-issue series that chronicled her adventures with various women of the Marvel Universe, including Storm, She-Hulk, the Enchantress, and Spider-Woman. It was written by Paul Tobin, with art by Salvador Espin, Veronica Gandini and Takeshi Miyazawa. The second four-issue miniseries, Black Widow: Deadly Origin, was written by Paul Cornell, and featured art by Tom Raney and John Paul Leon.

Fictional character biography

Early life

Natasha was born in Stalingrad (now Volgograd), Russian SFSR, USSR. The first and best-known Black Widow is a Russian agent trained as a spy, martial artist, and sniper, and outfitted with an arsenal of high-tech weaponry, including a pair of wrist-mounted energy weapons dubbed her "Widow's Bite". She wears no costume during her first few appearances but simply evening wear and a veil. Romanova eventually defects to the U.S. for reasons that include her love for the reluctant-criminal turned superhero archer, Hawkeye.

The first hints to Natasha Romanova's childhood come from Ivan Petrovich, who is introduced as her middle-aged chauffeur and confidant in the Black Widow's 1970s Amazing Adventures. Petrovich tells Matt Murdock that he had been given custody of little Natasha by a woman who died immediately afterwards, during the Battle of Stalingrad in autumn 1942. He consequently felt committed to raise the orphan as a surrogate father and she eventually trained as a Soviet spy, being eager to help her homeland. In another flashback, set in the fictional island of Madripoor in 1941, Petrovich helps Captain America and the mutant Logan, who would later become the Canadian super-agent and costumed hero Wolverine, to rescue Natasha from Nazis.

A revised, retconned origin establishes her as being raised from very early childhood by the U.S.S.R.'s "Black Widow Ops" program, rather than solely by Ivan Petrovitch. Petrovitch had taken her to Department X with other young female orphans, where she was brainwashed and trained in combat and espionage at the covert "Red Room" facility. There, she is biotechnologically and psycho-technologically enhanced—which provides a rationale for her unusually long and youthful lifespan. During that time she had some training under the Winter Soldier, and the pair even had a short romance. Each Black Widow is deployed with false memories to help ensure her loyalty. Romanova eventually discovers this, including the fact that she had never, as she had believed, been a ballerina. She further discovers that the Red Room is still active as "2R".

The KGB arranged a marriage between Natasha and the renowned Soviet test pilot Alexei Shostakov. However, when the Soviet government decided to make Shostakov into their new operative, the Red Guardian, he is told that he can have no further contact with his wife. Natasha is told that he died and is trained as a secret agent separately.

The Avengers
Romanova grew up to serve as a femme fatale. She was assigned to assist Boris Turgenov in the assassination of Professor Anton Vanko for defecting from the Soviet Union, which served as her first mission in the United States. Natasha and Turgenov infiltrated Stark Industries as part of the plan. She attempted to manipulate information from American defense contractor Tony Stark, and inevitably confronted his superhero alter ego, Iron Man. The pair then battled Iron Man, and Turgenov stole and wore the Crimson Dynamo suit. Vanko sacrificed himself to save Iron Man, killing Turgenov in the process, using an unstable experimental laser light pistol. Romanova later meets the criminal archer Hawkeye and sets him against Iron Man, and later helped Hawkeye battle Iron Man.

Later, Natasha again attempted to get Hawkeye to help her destroy Iron Man. The pair almost succeeded, but when Black Widow was injured, Hawkeye retreated to get her to safety. During this period, Romanova was attempting to defect from the Soviet Union and began falling in love with Hawkeye, weakening her loyalty to her country. When her employers learned the truth, the KGB had her gunned down, sending her to a hospital, convincing Hawkeye to go straight and seek membership in the Avengers.

The Red Room kidnapped and brainwashed her again, and with the Swordsman and the first Power Man, she battled the Avengers. She eventually broke free from her psychological conditioning (with the help of Hawkeye), and successfully defected, having further adventures with Spider-Man, with Hawkeye, and with Daredevil. She ultimately joins the Avengers as a costumed hero herself.

S.H.I.E.L.D. and Daredevil

Upon Nick Fury's request, she begins freelancing as an agent of the international espionage group S.H.I.E.L.D. She is sent on a secret S.H.I.E.L.D. mission to China by Nick Fury. There, with the Avengers, she battles Col. Ling, Gen. Brushov, and her ex-husband the Red Guardian. For a time, as writer Les Daniels noted in a contemporaneous study in 1971,

She investigates a plot by Egghead, the Puppet Master and the Mad Thinker to blackmail the US government using a laser-firing satellite.

During her romantic involvement with Matt Murdock in San Francisco, she operates as an independent superhero alongside Murdock's alter ego, Daredevil. There she tries unsuccessfully to find a new career for herself as a fashion designer. Eventually, her relationship with Murdock stagnates, and after briefly working with Avengers finally breaks up with Murdock, fearing that playing "sidekick" is sublimating her identity. During a HYDRA attempt to take over S.H.I.E.L.D., she is tortured to such an extent that she regresses back to an old cover identity of schoolteacher Nancy Rushman, but she is recovered by Spider-Man in time to help Nick Fury and Shang-Chi work out what had happened and restore her memory, with "Nancy" developing an attraction to Spider-Man before her memory is restored during the final fight against Madam Viper, Boomerang, and the Silver Samurai. She later returns to Matt Murdock's life to find he is romantically involved with another woman, Heather Glenn, prompting her to leave New York. Natasha ultimately realizes that Matt still only thinks of her in platonic terms, and elects to restrain herself from any advances.

The Champions
After their breakup, the Widow moves to Los Angeles and becomes leader of the newly created and short-lived super team known as The Champions, consisting of her, Ghost Rider (Johnny Blaze), Hercules (with whom she has a brief romance), and former X-Men Angel and Iceman.

Her friends usually call her "Natasha", the informal version of "Natalia". She has sometimes chosen the last-name alias "Romanoff". She has hinted to be a descendant of the deposed House of Romanov and a relation to Nicholas II of Russia.

21st century

Natasha crosses Daredevil's (Matt Murdock) path again when he attempts to slay an infant he believes to be the Anti-Christ while under the influence of mind-altering drugs. After Daredevil's one-time love, Karen Page, dies protecting the child, Natasha reconciles with Murdock, revealing she still loves him, but noting that he is too full of anger to commit to a relationship with her.

Natasha is challenged by Yelena Belova, a graduate from the training program through which Natasha herself was taught the espionage trade, who is the first to ever surpass Natasha's marks and considers herself the rightful successor to the "Black Widow" mantle. Natasha refers to her as "little one" and "rooskaya (meaning "Russian"), and encourages her to discover her individuality rather than live in blind service, asking her "why be Black Widow, when you can be Yelena Belova?" After several confrontations, Natasha subjects Yelena to intense psychological manipulation and suffering in order to teach her the reality of the espionage business, and an angry but disillusioned Yelena eventually returns home and temporarily quits being a spy. Although Matt Murdock is appalled by the cruelty of Natasha's treatment of Yelena, Nick Fury describes the action as Natasha's attempt at saving Yelena's life. After bringing the Avengers and the Thunderbolts together to overcome Count Nefaria, Natasha supported Daredevil's short-lived efforts to form a new super-team to capture the Punisher, originally believed to be Nick Fury's murderer. Despite recruitment endeavors, however, this vigilante group folded shortly after she and her teammate Dagger fought an army of renegade S.H.I.E.L.D. androids; ironically, she soon afterward worked with both Daredevil and Punisher against the European crime syndicate managed by the Brothers Grace. Months later, her pursuit of war criminal Anatoly Krylenko led to a clash with Hawkeye, whose pessimism regarding heroic activities now rivaled her own.

Shortly after the Scarlet Witch's insanity seemingly killed Hawkeye and again disbanded the Avengers, Natasha, weary of espionage and adventure, travelled to Arizona but was targeted. Andrea discovers that other women had been trained in the Black Widow Program, and all are now being hunted down and killed by the North Institute on behalf of the corporation Gynacon. Natasha's investigations led her back to Russia, where she was appalled to learn the previously unimagined extent of her past manipulation, and she discovered the Widows were being hunted because Gynacon, having purchased Russian biotechnology from Red Room's successor agency 2R, wanted all prior users of the technology dead. Natasha finds and kills the mastermind of the Black Widow murders: Ian McMasters, Gynacon's aging CEO, who intended to use part of their genetic structure to create a new chemical weapon. After killing McMasters, she clashed with operatives of multiple governments to help Sally Anne Carter, a girl Natasha had befriended in her investigations, whom she rescued with help from Daredevil and Yelena Belova. She soon returned the favor for Daredevil by reluctantly working with Elektra Natchios to protect his new wife, Milla Donovan, from the FBI and others, although Yelena proved beyond help when she agreed to be transformed into the new Super-Adaptoid by A.I.M. and HYDRA.

Civil War/Initiative
During the Superhero Civil War, Natasha becomes a supporter of the Superhuman Registration Act and a member of the taskforce led by Iron Man. Afterward, the registered Natasha joins the reconstituted Avengers. S.H.I.E.L.D. director Nick Fury is presumed killed, and deputy director Maria Hill incapacitated, so Natasha assumes temporary command of S.H.I.E.L.D. as the highest-ranking agent present.

Later, Tony Stark assigns Natasha to convey the late Captain America's shield to a secure location, but is intercepted by her former lover, Bucky Barnes, the Winter Soldier, who steals the shield. Natasha and the Falcon then rescue Barnes from the Red Skull's minions and bring him to the S.H.I.E.L.D. Helicarrier, where Stark convinces Bucky to become the new Captain America. Afterward, Natasha accompanies Bucky as his partner for a brief time until she is called back by S.H.I.E.L.D. She later rejoins him and Falcon for the final confrontation with the Red Skull, helping to rescue Sharon Carter. She and Bucky have restarted their relationship. She later plays an important role in the capture of Hercules. However, due to her respect of the Greek god, she let him go. Soon Natasha, along with the rest of the Avengers, gets involved in the current Skrull invasion. Afterwards, she stayed as Bucky's partner. She also assists former director Maria Hill in delivering a special form of data to Bucky.

Thunderbolts

Norman Osborn discovered Yelena Belova breaking into an abandoned S.H.I.E.L.D. facility, and offered her the position of field leader of the new Thunderbolts. On her first mission, she and Ant-Man take control of Air Force One with the Goblin, Doc Samson, and the new President aboard. It was suggested she faked her apparent death (as the Adaptoid) but it is never explained how.

A conversation with the Ghost implies that Yelena is working as a mole for someone else and that she may even be someone else disguised as Yelena. She is later seen talking privately through a comm-link to Nick Fury.

Osborn orders Yelena to lead the current Thunderbolts to kill former Thunderbolt, Songbird. Fury orders "Yelena" to rescue and retrieve Songbird for the information she might possess about Osborn and his operations. Yelena finds Songbird and reveals to her that she was really Natasha Romanova in disguise. She tries delivering Songbird to Fury but the Thunderbolts have also followed them. The trio are captured as Osborn reveals he had been impersonating Fury in messages all along to set Natasha up in order to strengthen the Thunderbolts and lead him to Fury. She and Songbird are brought to be executed but manage to escape when Ant-Man, Headsmen, and Paladin turn on the rest of the Thunderbolts and let them go.

Heroic Age
At the start of the "Heroic Age," Natasha is recruited by Steve Rogers into a new black-ops wing of the Avengers dubbed the Secret Avengers. She travels to Dubai with her new teammate, Valkyrie, where they steal a dangerous artifact which the Beast then studies, noting that it seems like a distant cousin of the Serpent Crown. In the story "Coppelia", she encounters a teenage clone of herself, code named "Tiny Dancer", whom she rescues from an arms dealer.

Fear Itself
During the "Fear Itself" storyline, Black Widow and Peregrine are sent on a mission to free hostages being held in a Marseille cathedral by Rapido. He and a group of mercenaries are trying to exploit the panic over the events in Paris to steal France's nuclear arsenal.

Ends of the Earth
During the "Ends of the Earth" storyline involving one of Doctor Octopus' schemes, Natasha is one of only three heroes left standing after the defeat of the Avengers by the Sinister Six, joining Silver Sable and Spider-Man to track the Six (albeit because she was closest to Sable's cloaked ship after the Avengers were defeated rather than for her prowess). She is later contacted by the Titanium Man to warn her and her allies about Doctor Octopus' attempt to rally other villains against Spider-Man. She is knocked out along with Hawkeye by Iron Man during a battle against the Avengers when they were temporarily under Octavius' remote control.

Secret Wars

During the incursion event between Earth-616 and Earth-1610, Natasha is involved in the final battle between the Marvel Universe's superheroes and the Ultimate Universe's Children of Tomorrow. She pilots a ship holding a handpicked few to restart humanity after the universe ends, copiloted by Jessica Drew. Her ship is shot down during the battle though, and she is killed in the ensuing explosion.

As the evacuation of Earth-616 begins in light of the fact that Earth-1610 is about to come crashing down as part of the "Last Days" storyline, Black Widow is seen standing atop a building with Captain America who gives her a list of people to save and bring aboard the lifeboat. As she tells Sam she cannot save them all, Sam explains it's Natasha's job to assist in the effort to save as many people as possible before Earth as they know it is destroyed. As she leaves, her mind transitions to Cold War Russia, where a young Natasha (here called Natalia) speaks with two Russian functionaries in the infamous "Red Room". She is given her first mission: travel to Cuba and locate a family called the Comienzas, who are at risk from Raúl Castro's regime and who may have information of vital importance to Russia. She is told to rendezvous with another agent, her classmate Marina, and befriend the family under the guise of a Russian businesswoman. Natasha assures them of her competency and leaves. When one of the officers questions her youth, the other assures him, "she's a killer. She will not disappoint." Natasha meets Marina in Cuba and the two friends catch up before meeting with the Comienzas that night at a local bar. Using her talent for deception, she casually and politely convinces the husband and wife that she's seeking inside information to help her import various goods into the country. The Comienzas explain they cannot reveal said information, prompting Natasha to later explain to Marina that the family might need "a little push". Not too soon she effectively began terrorizing the family into desperation. First, she plants an American flag on their doorstep to mimic someone accusing them of defecting to the United States. Later after meeting with one of the Russian officers from the Red Room to report her progress, she detonated a car bomb outside their home when the first attempt did not make them "nearly desperate enough". Following the car bomb explosion, Natasha declares the family is indeed desperate enough to reproach for information. Before letting Natasha go, the officer announces she has one additional task before her mission is over: Marina has become too much enamored with her civilian guise, and is now a security risk. Natasha will have to eliminate her. Flipping to the present, Black Widow is saving as many people as she can, but she quickly flashbacks to Havana. Natasha and her then Red Room partner Marina are trying to help a family defect. Natasha's orders are simple: Kill the parents and make it public. When Natasha asks if she should kill the child too, her boss looks horrified that she would be so OK with that and tells her no. Having no problem following orders she sets up a meet and using a sniper rifle she takes out the pair without blinking. Next she shoots Marina's boyfriend then Marina herself. Next she shoots Marina's cat. Flipping back to the present, Black Widow is back saving people from the incursion as the reason that triggered Natasha's flashback is revealed ... a man she saved is holding his cat. This dark, heartless side of the Black Widow shows why she is trying so hard to do good today.

Secret Empire

During the "Secret Empire" storyline, Black Widow appears as a member of the underground resistance at the time when most of the United States has been taken over by Hydra and Captain America who was brainwashed by Red Skull's clone using the powers of the sentient Cosmic Cube Kobik into believing that he was a Hydra sleeper agent. While Hawkeye assembles a strike force of Hercules and Quicksilver to find the Cosmic Cube fragments, Black Widow sets off to kill Rogers herself reasoning that even if Rick's theory is true, the man Rogers was would prefer to die than be used in this manner. She finds herself followed by the Champions as she establishes her version of the Red Room. While preparing to shoot Captain America with a sniper rifle, she rushes to prevent Miles Morales from killing him as predicted by Ulysses, and is struck by his shield, breaking her neck and killing her. Despite the return of the real Steve Rogers and the downfall of Hydra, Natasha's death, along with other casualties, remains.

Clone of Natalia Romanova
However, while observing a dictator who recently rose to power due to his support of Hydra, Bucky witnesses the man being assassinated in such a manner that he believes only Natasha could have pulled off the kill and believes he sees the Black Widow (actually Yelena Belova) depart from her chosen vantage point.

It was later discovered that a series of clones of the original Black Widow had been produced by the Black Widow Ops Program following her death. Its member Ursa Major bribed Epsilon Red to let him add the current memories of the deceased Natalia Romanova to one such clone while secretly disposing of the bad programming. The Black Widow Ops Program tasked the clone into taking out the remnants of Hydra and S.H.I.E.L.D. She revealed herself to Winter Soldier and Hawkeye while also killing Orphan Maker. To keep them from interfering, the Black Widow clone locked Winter Soldier and Hawkeye in a safe room within the Red Room. The Black Widow clone rose to the ranks of the Red Room while secretly persuading the recruits to turn against their masters. When Winter Soldier and Hawkeye arrived at the Red Room, the Black Widow clone dropped her cover where she began to kill her superiors, liberate the recruits and destroy all the clones and Epsilon Red. When the authorities arrived, The Black Widow clone, adopting the name Natasha Romanoff, left the Red Room, where she left a note for Hawkeye to stop following her and for Winter Soldier to join her in ending the Red Room.

During the "Infinity Countdown" storyline, the Black Widow clone traced a dead drop signal left by a revived Wolverine in Madripoor. She discovered that Wolverine had left the Space Infinity Gem in her care. The Black Widow clone meets up with Doctor Strange who wants to dispose of the Space Stone. Doctor Strange did not want to take it as he knows what would happen if they are in the same proximity. She is among the Infinity Gem holders who are contacted by Doctor Strange stating that they need to reform the Infinity Watch in order to safeguard the Infinity Gems from such calamities like Thanos.

Captain America had Black Widow's clone infiltrate Roxxon as an ex-S.H.I.E.L.D. operative-turned-contractor named Angel to spy on Roxxon and keep an eye on Weapon H. As Angel, she accompanied Weapon H and his assigned team to Weirdworld up to the point where Morgan le Fay of Earth-15238 exposed her identity to Weapon H. After getting out of the wreckage of the Roxxon Research Outpost, Black Widow reveals to Blake that she was sent to get the Roxxon group out of Weirdworld. Dr. Carrie Espinoza and the Roxxon soldiers with her salvage a Weirdworld Adamantine Crystal filled with Morgan le Fay's mystic energies which Dr. Esponoza states to Black Widow and Blake that it can power all of New York for 10 years. As the group arrives near the Inaku village, they witness Weapon H fighting Korg as Black Widow is contacted by Sonia Sung from Roxxon's headquarters. Black Widow tries to help Sonia get through to Weapon H until Dario Agger arrives. Black Widow is among those that are evacuated through the portal.

Powers and abilities
Black Widow has been enhanced by biotechnology that makes her body resistant to aging and disease and she heals faster than the average human. The white blood cells in her body are also enhanced by these implants, making them efficient enough to fight off most microbes, foreign bodies and other threats to her body, keeping her healthy and immune to most, if not all, infections, diseases and physical disorders.

Romanova has a gifted intellect. She displays an uncanny affinity for psychological manipulation and can mask her real emotions perfectly. Like Steve Rogers, she possesses the ability to quickly process multiple information streams (such as threat assessment) and rapidly respond to changing tactical situations, as well as having extensive espionage training.

Black Widow is a world-class athlete, gymnast, acrobat, and aerialist, capable of numerous complex maneuvers and feats. She can coordinate her body with balance, flexibility, and dexterity easily, and is an accomplished ballerina. She has mastered several martial arts such as jiu jitsu, aikido, boxing, judo, karate, savate, ninjutsu, various styles of kung fu and kenpo, as well as the Russian martial art sambo. She also underwent training on how to masterfully use sidearms, marksman rifles and melee weapons such as batons and combat knives.

She is also a skilled hypnotist. She uses a combination of techniques such as direct eye contact, hypnotic speech patterns and a soothing voice to influence a subjects' mind, planting thoughts, ideas or post-hypnotic commands, or even affecting memories and personality traits.

Equipment
Black Widow uses a variety of equipment invented by Soviet scientists and technicians, with later improvements by S.H.I.E.L.D. scientists and technicians. She usually wears distinctively shaped bracelets which fire the Widow's Bite electro-static energy blasts that can deliver charges up to 30,000 volts, as well as "Widow's Line" grappling hooks, tear gas pellets, and a new element introduced during her ongoing series during the "Kiss or Kill" arc called the "Widow's Kiss"—an aerosol instant knock-out gas she has modified. She wears a belt of metallic discs; some are disc-charges containing plastic explosives, while others have been shown to be compartments for housing other equipment. Her costume consists of synthetic stretch fabric equipped with micro-suction cups on fingers and feet, enabling her to adhere to walls and ceilings. In the 2006 "Homecoming" mini-series, she was seen using knives, unarmed combat, and various firearms, but she has since begun using her bracelets again. While in disguise as Yelena Belova, when infiltrating the then Osborn-sanctioned Thunderbolts during "Dark Reign", she used a specialized multi-lens goggle/head-carapace that demonstrated various technical abilities, such as enhancing vision and communication. Later, she has used a modified gun based on her Widow's Bite wrist cartridge during her adventures alongside the new Captain America.

Supporting characters

Reception

Accolades 

 In 2009, IGN included Black Widow in their "Marvel's Femme Fatales" list.
 In 2011, Wizard Magazine ranked Black Widow 176th in their "Top 200 Comic Book Characters" list.
 In 2011, IGN ranked Black Widow 74th in their "Top 100 Comic Book Heroes" list.
 In 2011, Comics Buyer's Guide ranked Black Widow 31st in their "100 Sexiest Women in Comics" list.
 In 2012, IGN ranked Black Widow 42nd in their "Top 50 Avengers" list.
 In 2015, Gizmodo ranked Black Widow 13th in their "Every Member Of The Avengers" list.
 In 2015, Entertainment Weekly ranked Black Widow 14th in their "Let's rank every Avenger ever" list.
 In 2015, BuzzFeed ranked Black Widow 3rd in their "84 Avengers Members Ranked From Worst To Best" list.
 In 2017, The Daily Dot ranked Black Widow 9th in their "Top 33 female superheroes of all time" list.
 In 2018, Vanity Fair included Black Widow in their "Stan Lee’s Most Iconic Characters" list.
 In 2018, GameSpot ranked Black Widow 46th  in their "50 Most Important Superheroes" list.
 In 2019, Comicbook.com ranked Black Widow 41st in their "50 Most Important Superheroes Ever" list.
 In 2019, Daily Mirror ranked Black Widow 11th in their "Best female superheroes of all time" list.
 In 2019, CBR.com ranked Black Widow 6th in their "10 Most Powerful Russians In Comics" list.
 In 2020, Scary Mommy ranked Black Widow 1st in their "Looking For A Role Model? These 195+ Marvel Female Characters Are Truly Heroic" list.
 In 2022, The A.V. Club ranked Black Widow 10th in their "100 best Marvel characters" list.
 In 2022, MovieWeb ranked Black Widow 4th in their "Toughest Female Superheroes" list.
 In 2022, Screen Rant included Black Widow in their "10 Best Villains Who Became Heroes In Marvel Comics" list.

Other versions

1602

In Marvel 1602, a world where superheroes have started to appear several hundred years early, Natasha is a freelance spy and "the most dangerous woman in Europe." Initially allied with Matthew Murdoch (Daredevil's 1602 counterpart), she later betrays him to Count Otto Von Doom, whom she shares a romantic relationship with. It is Natasha who later comes to Doom's rescue when he is horribly burned by Thor's lightning & the accompanying discharge of Blake's golden sphere.

Natasha is still working with Count von Doom during Marvel 1602: Fantastick Four where she is the captain of his flying ship. However, when she questions his plan to take the ship to the edge of the world, he pushes her over the side and appoints the Wizard captain.

1872
The Secret Wars War Zone of 1872 reimagines Natasha in the Wild West in the town of Timely. Natasha Barnes is a widow who was married to Deputy Bucky Barnes, who was killed by Mayor Fisk's men when he tried to stop a lynching. Fisk had her believe the Native Americans were responsible for his death until Sheriff Rogers told her the truth. After Sheriff Rogers was killed by Fisk and his men, Natasha teams up with Red Wolf and Doctor Bruce Banner to take Fisk down and destroy the dam separating the Cheyenne from their water.

Age of Ultron
In the Age of Ultron story, Black Widow is shown after Ultron's attack with disfiguring scars on the right side of her face from an unknown source, disarming a desperate and panicked man who attempts to threaten her for resources before meeting up with Moon Knight in one of Nick Fury's old bases.

The Avengers: United They Stand

Natasha Romanoff/Black Widow appeared in the comic-book series based on the animated television series The Avengers: United They Stand.

Earth X

Natasha Romanova appeared in the Earth X miniseries much the same as her 616 counterpart. After Absorbing Man was broken to pieces by The Vision after killing The Avengers (Giant Man, Wasp, Scarlet Witch, Quicksilver and Hawkeye), part of his body was given to her to guard in order to prevent anyone from putting Absorbing man back together.  She was killed sometime before the start of Earth X. Later in the series, she is revealed in the Realm of the Dead and is recruited by Mar-Vell into his legion of the undead.

House of M

Natasha is seen as a member of the Soviet Super Soldiers. Natasha later appears a member of Shang-Chi's Red Dragons, and is mentioned as a member of S.H.I.E.L.D.

Marvel Mangaverse

She appears in the New Dawn arc where The Executioner and she are hired by Mordo to kidnap Bruce Banner. They manage to succeed in doing so, with her escaping with Bruce while Tigra is dealing with The Executioner intent on keeping the reward for the job herself. However, during her escape, Bruce turns into The Hulk and destroys the submarine they were in, presumably killing her.

Marvel Zombies

Black Widow is among the Avengers who are infected by the Sentry in Marvel Zombies vs. the Army of Darkness. She is seen consuming a Yorkshire Terrier puppy. Later, in the original Marvel Zombies series, she is among the zombies who attack the Silver Surfer.

Ultimate Marvel

Under the Ultimate Marvel imprint Natasha Romanova is a member of the Ultimates, this universe's analogue of the Avengers. She debuted in Ultimate Marvel Team-Up #14 (June 2002) in a story written by Brian Michael Bendis and drawn by Terry Moore, before becoming one of the major characters in writer Mark Millar and penciller Bryan Hitch's The Ultimates, debuting there in #7 (Sept. 2002).

Romanova is a former KGB spy and assassin, code-named the Black Widow, known for killing her ex-husbands, notably Alexi Shostakov. She was originally part of the Ultimates' covert operations ("black ops") team, but with the emergence of the Chitauri threat was subsequently moved to public status after a publicly acceptable background was written for her. She has genetic or cybernetic enhancements making her far better in combat than the average human. After accepting a marriage proposal from Tony Stark, she receives a black suit of Iron Man armor as an engagement present, along with a set of nanites to control the armor.

Romanova is later revealed as a traitor—claiming that she betrayed the Ultimates because she feels that America has turned her country into a collection of drug-runners and prostitutes—responsible for killing Hawkeye's wife and children, revealing Bruce Banner's connection to the Hulk to the public, helping to frame Captain America as a traitor, and collaborating with the Liberators in their invasion of the United States. After she murders Edwin Jarvis and holds Stark hostage in an attempt to extort his fortune, Stark activates the nanites in her bloodstream, freezing her body in place, before knocking her unconscious with a wine bottle. She appears later in an emergency clinic, having cut open her wrists to bleed out the disabling nanites. Hawkeye kills her in revenge for her part in the murder of his family.

By The Ultimates 3 #1 a sex tape between Natasha and Stark has been leaked to the public. According to Janet Pym, the tape is of unknown origin and seems to have been professionally done with "close ups". Stark is shown to be in a state of depression over Natasha's betrayal and subsequent death. It is later revealed that one of the Ultrons calling himself Yellowjacket had leaked the tape. During the Brotherhood's attack on the Stark Mansion, Mystique shapeshifts into Natasha to get close to Tony in an attempt to kill him but is knocked unconscious by Wasp.

What If?
In What If? Age of Ultron #3, where Thor was killed, Natasha becomes the new wielder of Mjolnir to hold off an assault by the World-Serpent in Thor's absence.

In other media

Television
 Black Widow was to appear in a proposed live-action 1975 series, portrayed by series creator Angie Bowie. However, the series was not picked up by a studio.
 Black Widow appears in the "Iron Man" segment of The Marvel Super Heroes, voiced by Margaret Griffin.
 Black Widow appears in The Super Hero Squad Show episode "Deadly is the Black Widow's Bite!", voiced by Lena Headey.
 Black Widow appears in The Avengers: Earth's Mightiest Heroes, voiced by Vanessa Marshall. This version is an agent of S.H.I.E.L.D.
 Black Widow appears in Iron Man: Armored Adventures, voiced by Ashleigh Ball. This version is initially a freelancer before eventually joining S.H.I.E.L.D.
 Black Widow appears in Avengers Assemble, voiced by Laura Bailey. This version is a member of the Avengers.
 Black Widow appears in Lego Marvel Super Heroes: Maximum Overload, voiced by again by Laura Bailey.
 Black Widow appears in Ultimate Spider-Man, voiced again by Laura Bailey. This version is a member of the Avengers.
 Black Widow appears in Marvel Disk Wars: The Avengers.
 Black Widow appears in Lego Marvel Super Heroes: Avengers Reassembled, voiced again by Laura Bailey.
 Black Widow appears in the Spider-Man episode "Spider-Island" Part 2, voiced again by Laura Bailey.
 Black Widow appears in Lego Marvel Super Heroes - Black Panther: Trouble in Wakanda, voiced again by Laura Bailey.
 Black Widow appears in Marvel Future Avengers, voiced by Mayumi Asano in Japanese and Laura Bailey in English.

Film
 In 2004, Lionsgate Entertainment announced that a Black Widow motion picture by screenwriter-director David Hayter and starring Natasha Romanoff was in the script stage. Lionsgate subsequently dropped the project.
 The Ultimate Marvel incarnation of Black Widow appears in Ultimate Avengers Ultimate Avengers 2, voiced by Olivia d'Abo.
 Black Widow makes a non-speaking cameo appearance in Next Avengers: Heroes of Tomorrow, in which she joined the Avengers in stopping Ultron. Though she was killed in battle, she is survived by her and Captain America's son James Rogers.
 Black Widow appears in Iron Man: Rise of Technovore, voiced by Clare Grant.
 Black Widow appears in Avengers Confidential: Black Widow & Punisher, voiced by Jennifer Carpenter.

Marvel Cinematic Universe

Natasha Romanoff / Black Widow appears in media set in the Marvel Cinematic Universe (MCU), portrayed by Scarlett Johansson. This version is a former assassin for the Red Room before joining S.H.I.E.L.D. and founding the Avengers. She first appears in the live-action film Iron Man 2 before making subsequent appearances in the live-action films The Avengers (2012), Captain America: The Winter Soldier (2014), Avengers: Age of Ultron (2015), Captain America: Civil War (2016), Avengers: Infinity War (2018), Captain Marvel (2019), Avengers: Endgame (2019), and a self-titled film (2021). Additionally, alternate timeline versions of Romanoff appear in the Disney+ animated series What If...?, voiced by Lake Bell.

Video games
 Black Widow appears in The Punisher, voiced by Saffron Henderson.
 Black Widow appears as a playable character in PlayStation Portable (PSP) and the PC versions of Marvel: Ultimate Alliance, voiced by Nika Futterman.
 Black Widow appears in Spider-Man: Web of Shadows, voiced by Salli Saffioti.
 Black Widow appears as a boss in Marvel: Ultimate Alliance 2, voiced again by Nika Futterman.
 Black Widow, based on the MCU incarnation, appears in the Iron Man 2 tie-in game, voiced by Catherine Campion.
 Black Widow appears as a playable character in Marvel Super Hero Squad: The Infinity Gauntlet, voiced by Grey DeLisle.
 Black Widow appears as a playable character in Marvel Super Hero Squad Online, voiced by Laura Bailey.
 Black Widow appears as a playable character in Marvel Strike Force.
 Black Widow appears as a playable character in Marvel: Avengers Alliance.
 Black Widow appears as a card in Ultimate Marvel vs Capcom 3s Heroes vs Heralds mode
 Black Widow appears as a playable character in Marvel Contest of Champions.
 Black Widow appears as a playable character in Marvel Avengers: Battle for Earth.
 Black Widow appears in LittleBigPlanet via the "Marvel Costume Kit 5" DLC.
 Black Widow appears in Zen Pinball 2 via the "Women of Power" DLC pack's A-Force table.
 Black Widow appears as a playable character in Marvel Heroes, voiced by Julianne Buescher.
 Black Widow appears as a playable character in Lego Marvel Super Heroes voiced again by Laura Bailey.
 Black Widow appears as a playable character in Marvel Avengers Alliance Tactics.
 Black Widow appears as a playable character in Disney Infinity 2.0, voiced again by Laura Bailey.
 Black Widow appears as a playable character in Disney Infinity 3.0, voiced again by Laura Bailey.
 Five variants of Black Widow appear in Marvel Puzzle Quest.
 Black Widow appears as a playable character in Marvel: Future Fight.
 Black Widow appears as a playable character in Lego Marvel's Avengers, voiced by Scarlett Johansson. 
 A teenage version of Black Widow appears as a playable character in Marvel Avengers Academy, voiced by Alison Brie.

 Black Widow appears as a downloadable playable character in Marvel vs. Capcom: Infinite, voiced again by Laura Bailey.
 Black Widow appears as a playable character in Lego Marvel Super Heroes 2, voiced by Maria Teresa Creasey.
 Black Widow appears as a playable character in Marvel Powers United VR, voiced again  by Laura Bailey.
 Black Widow appears as a playable character in Marvel Ultimate Alliance 3: The Black Order, voiced again by Laura Bailey.
 Black Widow appears as a playable character in Marvel's Avengers, voiced again by Laura Bailey.
 Black Widow appears as a playable character in Marvel Future Revolution, voiced again by Laura Bailey. Additionally, several alternate universe incarnations of Black Widow appear as NPCs, such as one who went undercover in the Hydra Empire and one who joined a secret rebellion against the Maestro on Sakaar.
 The mainstream and MCU incarnations of Black Widow, with the latter based on her appearances in Avengers: Endgame and her self-titled film, appear as alternate skins in Fortnite Battle Royale.

Novels
 Black Widow appears in the novels Black Widow: Forever Red (2015) and Black Widow: Red Vengeance (2016), by Margaret Stohl.
 Black Widow appears in the prose novel adaptation of The Death of Captain America.
 Black Widow appears in the prose novel adaptation of Civil War.
 Black Widow, based on the MCU incarnation, appears in Avengers: Everybody Wants To Rule The World.

Miscellaneous
 Black Widow appears in the Spider-Woman motion comic, voiced by JoEllen Anklam.
 Black Widow appears in Marvel Universe: LIVE! as a member of the Avengers. Former motorcycle racer Louise Forsley has portrayed the character as of 2015.
 Black Widow appears in Black Widow: Bad Blood audio novel.

Collected editions

See also
 List of Russian superheroes
 List of Marvel Comics superhero debuts

References

External links
 Black Widow at Marvel.com
 Richard Morgan on Black Widow in an interview by Francesco Troccoli, August 2008
 "Richard K. Morgan Talks Marvel's Black Widow", Comic Book Resources, November 16, 2004
 Black Widow at Comics2Film
 
 Natasha Romanova at the Marvel Directory
 Natasha Romanova at Don Markstein's Toonopedia
 

Avengers (comics) characters
Black Widow (Marvel Comics)
Characters created by Don Heck
Characters created by Stan Lee
Comics characters introduced in 1964
Female characters in film
Fictional aikidoka
Fictional assassins in comics
Fictional ballet dancers
Fictional characters with slowed ageing
Fictional female assassins
Fictional female martial artists
Fictional female secret agents and spies
Fictional judoka
Fictional karateka
Fictional KGB agents
Fictional Ninjutsu practitioners
Fictional people from the 20th-century
Fictional people with acquired American citizenship
Fictional polyglots
Fictional savateurs
Fictional Systema practitioners
Fictional women soldiers and warriors
Marvel Comics adapted into films
Marvel Comics female superheroes
Marvel Comics film characters
Marvel Comics martial artists
Marvel Comics orphans
Russian superheroes
S.H.I.E.L.D. agents